"Fly Away" is a song written by David Foster and Carole Bayer Sager. It was originally recorded by Mariya Takeuchi for her 1980 album Love Songs.

Peter Allen version

Peter Allen covered the song for his 1980 album Bi-Coastal.

The song is Allen's only Billboard Hot 100 entry, peaking at No. 55.

Chart performance

Stevie Woods version

Stevie Woods covered the song for his 1981 album Take Me to Your Heaven.

The song is Woods' final Billboard Hot 100 entry, peaking at No. 84.

Chart performance

References

Songs written by David Foster
Songs written by Carole Bayer Sager
1980 songs
1980 singles
A&M Records singles
1982 singles
Cotillion Records singles
Mariya Takeuchi songs
Stevie Woods (musician) songs